White Cane Safety Day is a national observance in the United States, celebrated on October 15 of each year since 1964. The date is set aside to celebrate the achievements of people who are blind or visually impaired and the important symbol of blindness and tool of independence, the white cane.

This resolution authorized the President of the United States to proclaim October 15 of each year as "White Cane Safety Day".

President Lyndon B. Johnson signed the first White Cane Safety Day proclamation within hours of the passage of the joint resolution.

In 2011, White Cane Safety Day was also named Blind Americans Equality Day by President Barack Obama.

Notes

External links 

 White Cane Safety Day: A Symbol of Independence (article from the National Federation of the Blind web site)
 White Cane Safety Day celebration website
 36 U.S.C. § 142
 Special Postal Cover and Cancellation on occasion of 2009 International White Cane Safety Day, 15 Oct 2009, launched at GPO Bangalore

Sample proclamations

 2005
 2007
 2009

Public holidays in the United States
Accessibility
Blindness equipment
October observances
Disability in the United States